Jacob Adicoff (born May 16, 1995) is an American visually impaired cross-country skier and biathlete. He competed at the Winter Paralympics in 2014 and 2018.

Career
Jake Adicoff claimed his first Paralympic medal after clinching a silver medal in the men's 10km visually impaired cross-country skiing event during the 2018 Winter Paralympics. Notably, he dedicated the silver medal to Mugsy, his dog.

He won the gold medal in the men's 12.5km visually impaired cross-country skiing event at the 2021 World Para Snow Sports Championships held in Lillehammer, Norway. He also won the bronze medal in the men's long-distance visually impaired cross-country skiing event.

References

External links 
 
 

1995 births
Living people
American male cross-country skiers
American male biathletes
Cross-country skiers at the 2014 Winter Paralympics
Cross-country skiers at the 2018 Winter Paralympics
Cross-country skiers at the 2022 Winter Paralympics
Biathletes at the 2014 Winter Paralympics
Paralympic cross-country skiers of the United States
Paralympic biathletes of the United States
Paralympic gold medalists for the United States
Paralympic silver medalists for the United States
Medalists at the 2018 Winter Paralympics
Medalists at the 2022 Winter Paralympics
American blind people
Visually impaired category Paralympic competitors
Sportspeople from San Jose, California
Paralympic medalists in cross-country skiing
21st-century American people